Jeremiah Atwater (December 27, 1773 – July 29, 1858) was notable as an educator, minister, and college president. Atwater became principal of the Addison County Grammar School in 1799 and, a year later, when the school became Middlebury College, assumed the role of its first president. In 1809, Atwater left Middlebury to become the third president of Dickinson College in Pennsylvania. He remained in that position until 1815, when he returned to New Haven, Connecticut, his birthplace and home of his alma mater, Yale University. Atwater Commons, one of five residential commons at Middlebury, is named for him. Dickinson College also has an Atwater Hall named for him.  Atwater was elected a member of the American Antiquarian Society in 1815.

References

1773 births
1858 deaths
Religious leaders from New Haven, Connecticut
Yale University alumni
Presidents of Middlebury College
Members of the American Antiquarian Society
People of colonial Connecticut
Presidents of Dickinson College